Reckoning may refer to:

Arts, entertainment, and media

Music
 Reckoning (Grateful Dead album), 1981 live album
 Reckoning (R.E.M. album), 1984 album
 "Reckoning", a song by Killswitch Engage from Killswitch Engage (2009 album)

Television
 Reckoning (TV series), a 2019 Australian thriller drama
 "Reckoning" (Justified), an episode of the television series Justified
 "Reckoning" (Stargate SG-1), episodes of the television series Stargate SG-1
 "Reckoning" (The Killing), an episode of the television series The Killing
 "Reckoning", a season 1 episode of the television series Alias
 "Reckoning", a season 5 episode of the television series Smallville
 "Reckoning", episode and series finale of the television series Burn Notice
 "Reckoning", episode of the television series Everwood
 "Reckoning", episode of the television series Revenge
 "Reckoning", the penultimate season 4 episode of the television series Turn: Washington's Spies
 Chapter 7: The Reckoning, an episode of The Mandalorian

Other uses in arts, entertainment, and media
 Reckoning (2004 novel), by Thomas E. Sniegoski from his The Fallen series
 Reckoning (film), American Western film by Jason Rodriguez
 Kingdoms of Amalur: Reckoning, a 2012 video game
 Reckoning (rolling cutter), a finisher move of the professional wrestler Damian Priest
 Mia Yim, American professional wrestler also knows as Reckoning

See also
 Dead Reckoning (disambiguation)
 The Reckoning (disambiguation)